Barry Onslow Hands (26 September 1916 – 1 July 1984) was an English cricketer.  Hands was a left-handed batsman who bowled right-arm off break.  He was born at Moseley, Warwickshire.

Hands made his first-class debut for Warwickshire against Leicestershire at Kirkby Road, Barnwell in the 1946 County Championship.  He made two further first-class appearances for the county in the 1947 County Championship against Glamorgan at St. Helen's, Swansea, and Hampshire at the County Ground, Southampton.  In his three first-class matches, Hands took a total of 4 wickets at an average of 34.25, with best figures of 3/76.  With the bat, he scored 13 runs at a batting average of 6.50, with a high score of 9.

He died at Birmingham, Warwickshire on 1 July 1984.  His uncle, William Hands, also played first-class cricket for Warwickshire.

References

External links
Barry Hands at ESPNcricinfo
Barry Hands at CricketArchive

1916 births
1984 deaths
People from Moseley
English cricketers
Warwickshire cricketers